Laura Bruschini (born 26 August 1966 in Lecco) is a former female beach volleyball player from Italy, who represented her native country at the 2000 Summer Olympics. Partnering Annamaria Solazzi she thrice claimed the gold medal at the European Championships: 1997, 1999 and 2000.

Playing partners
 Annamaria Solazzi
 Daniela Gattelli
 Nicoletta Luciani
 Diletta Lunardi
 Caterina De Marinis
 Cristiana Parenzan

References

External links
 
 

1966 births
Living people
Sportspeople from Lecco
Italian beach volleyball players
Beach volleyball players at the 2000 Summer Olympics
Olympic beach volleyball players of Italy

Women's beach volleyball players